Natural Selection is a 2011 American comedy-drama film written and directed by Robbie Pickering. It stars Rachael Harris, Matt O'Leary, John Diehl, and Jon Gries. The film was accepted by South by Southwest for the 2011 Narrative Feature Competition.

Synopsis 
Linda White, a barren Christian housewife, leads a sheltered existence in suburban Texas. Her world is turned upside-down when she discovers that her dying husband, Abe, has a 23-year-old son through a sperm bank named Raymond living in Florida.  Somewhere on the edge of guilt and loneliness, Linda grants Abe's final wish and sets off on a quixotic journey to find Raymond and bring him back before her husband passes away. Along the way, Linda's wonderfully bizarre relationship with Raymond's roommate, an escaped con purporting to be Raymond, will teach her more about herself than she ever imagined possible and force her to come to terms with her troubled past.

Awards and accolades 
Natural Selection was well received at its 2011 South by Southwest debut, winning both jury and audience awards for best narrative feature, in addition to best screenplay, best editing, and best score/music.

Lead actors Rachael Harris and Matt O'Leary both received breakthrough performance awards.

The film so impressed critic Roger Ebert that he showed the film at Ebertfest in 2011 and granted it three-and-a-half out of four stars.  Both director Robbie Pickering and actress Rachael Harris received Golden Thumb awards.

References

External links 
 Natural Selection at SXSW
 Natural Selection at the Internet Movie Database

2011 films
2010s English-language films